The following is a list of characters from the series Kaijudo.

Protagonists

Ray
 (voiced by Scott Wolf) – The half Japanese main protagonist of the series who is the son of Janet (née Pierce) and Ken Okamoto. He lives on the central California coast in the city of San Campion with his mom and paternal grandfather. His creature partner is Tatsurion the Unchained. Raiden's natural ability to befriend the creatures comes from his father Ken Okamoto (who The Choten converted into Saguru) and his birth in the Creature Realms when Ken and Janet were hiding in the Nature Civilization from The Choten.

Allie
 (voiced by Kari Wahlgren) – A girl who has been friends with Ray since their childhood, she has a wealthy father but does not act like a stereotypical rich girl. She is fiercely independent and extremely adventurous. Her creature partner is Scaradorable of Gloom Hollow. Her mother Piper ran away before her tenth birthday, although the reason was never explained. It is implied in several episodes that Allie has a crush on Ray.

Gabe
 (voiced by Phil LaMarr) – A friend of Ray, he is more direct than most people, but is honest and true. His creature partner is Reef Prince Glu-urrgle. He later meets Sasha, Channeler of Light who becomes his second partner. Following the fight at The Choten's base and the treachery of Master Nigel, Gabe is later chosen as the temporary Duel Master of the Light Civilization (due to his connection with Sasha) until the Duel Masters can find a suitable replacement for Nigel.

Duel Masters

Hector Chavez
Master Hector Chavez (voiced by Freddy Rodriguez) – A Duel Master and expert on the Fire Civilization, Master Hector Chavez is always on the front lines of Earth, where he fights any creatures that come through the tears in the Veil.  His creature partner is Gilaflame the Assaulter. During both "Heart of Darkness" episodes, he has given hints that he has a crush on Master Nadia. By the episode "The Rising" Pt. 2, Master Jaha tells Master Chavez and Master Nadia to admit their feelings towards each other as they both kiss.

Master Jaha
Master Jaha (voiced by Dee Bradley Baker) – An elderly dwarfish female Duel Master, she is the most resourceful of the group and an expert on the Darkness Civilization. Her creature partner is Black Feather of Shadow Abyss. Master Jaha collects secrets kept hidden on both sides of the Veil. She was the Darkness Duel Master when The Choten was still in the order. In the episode "Heart of Darkness" Part 2, Megaria the Collector and Master Jaha reveal that they have known each other for a long time. Master Jaha may once have been Megaria's protege. Master Jaha says that her walking cane was a part of Megaria's brother. In the episode "The Rising" Pt. 1 during the fight at The Choten's base, Master Jaha sides with The Choten. When Master Chavez asks Master Jaha why she sided with Choten, Master Jaha says, "I'm sorry, Chavez. This is the way of darkness." She orders the freed Black Feather of Shadow Abyss to attack Master Chavez.  In "The Rising" Pt. 2, it turns out that this is a ruse to knock out Master Nigel as she quotes to Master Chavez "those who work with darkness works in mysterious ways." In "Siege," Master Jaha was aged by Megaria during the Choten's siege of the Duel Master's temple. In "The Evolution Will Not Be Televised," Master Isao Okamoto uses his mana to keep Master Jaha alive. When the Spell of Radiant Purification is cast by Raiden, the curse on Master Jaha is undone as she finds herself younger, (and taller), than she was before.

Master Benjirou Kimora
Master Benjirou Kimora (voiced by Andrew Kishino) – A sumo-like Duel Master and expert on the Nature Civilization, Master Benjirou Kimora serves as the front man for the martial arts dojo that hides the Duel Masters Temple. His creature partner is Mighty Shouter. He succeeds the previous Nature Duel Master Ken Takahashi Okamoto (Ray's father).

Master Nadia Lobachevsky
Master Nadia Lobachevsky (voiced by Grey DeLisle in a Russian accent) – A female Duel Master and expert on the Water Civilization, she has spent years studying the Creature Realms and the Veil that protects the Creature Realms and Earth from each other. In the past, when The Choten was a Duel Master at the Kaijudo Temple, Nadia was an acolyte. Her creature partner is Aqua Chaser, Rusalka. During both "Heart of Darkness" episodes, Master Chavez has shown signs of having a crush on Master Nadia. By the episode "The Rising" Part 2, Master Jaha tells Master Chavez and Master Nadia to admit their feelings towards each other as they both kiss.

Evil Forces

The Choten
The Choten (voiced by Oded Fehr) – The primary antagonist of the series. His real name is August. The Choten is an evil genius and a former Duel Master that went rogue to pursue his own goals. He may have been the former Water Civilization Duel Master, preceding Master Nadia. His main creature partner is Aqua Seneschal, and he has a secondary creature partner named Trox, General of Destruction. Both creatures help the Choten with his plots. From his hideout in the Skidbladner ship, the Choten has many allies to help him in his goals to enslave the creatures and take over Earth once the Veil that separates both worlds is brought down. The Choten seeks the artifacts of the Five Civilizations in order to control the creatures and take over Earth.  When the Choten finally collects all five relics of the Five Civilizations, he announces that it is time for the Creature Kings to rise. In the episode "The Rising" Part 1, the Choten goes to great lengths to capture the Duel Masters' creatures in order to prevent them from interfering with his plan of summoning the Creature Civilization Monarchs. He succeeds in awakening them and summons King Tritonus to him. In "The Rising" Part 2, the Choten summons Infernus the Immolator, Almighty Colossus, Queen Kalima, and Eternal Haven to him in order to take down the Veil. When the Veil is restored, The Choten and his base end up in the Creature World alongside Master Nigel, Fingers, and Heller. The Choten plans to make his army within the Creature World. He starts by using the Helm of Ultimate Technology to control King Tritonus in order to use Water Civilization technology to repair and upgrade the Skidbladner. Upon obtaining the horns from some of the Rumbling Terrasaurs, the Choten forms an alliance with Megaria. In "Siege," the Choten uses the Weapon of Mass Evolution on the Null Zone to evolve the creatures in the radius of its explosion in order to control them. He also uses a large saw made up of some Rumbling Terrasaur horns to open a portal to San Campion. In "The Evolution Will Not Be Televised," the Choten captures the Light Mystic so that he can have an endless battery source. When Raiden gets through to his father, the Saguru/Humonculon webs up the Choten. With his plans thwarted, the Choten escapes by banishing the Saguru/Humonculon; Saguru is later rescued by Tay, leaving the Choten's fate unknown.

Joseph
Joseph "Fingers" (voiced by Jason Marsden) – Joseph is a duelist who is nicknamed "Fingers" because of an injury in which he lost two of the fingers on his right hand following an incident with an unknown creature. He is an ally of the Choten, for whom he gathers corrupted creatures to help build the Choten's army. Joseph infiltrates the Duel Masters Temple as a newcomer acolyte in order to obtain some tablets. While the other Duel Masters are fighting Flametropus (who Fingers releases from the vault part of the Kaijudo Temple's creature stables), Ray, Gabe, Allie, and Master Chavez manage to repel Fingers, who manages to escape. In the fight against the Choten at his hideout, Fingers is sucked into the Creature World with the Choten, Master Nigel, and Heller.

Heller
Heller (voiced by John DiMaggio) – Heller is a notoriously quick-tempered thug who works as a thief. One of the things he steals is one of the Choten's Duel Gauntlets. He discovers its power when he unknowingly summons Shaw K'Naw to Earth and uses it to commit a crime spree throughout San Campion. He encounters Ray, Gabe, and Allie, and Shaw K'Naw temporarily blinds Ray, then injures Master Nigel in a second encounter. When Ray comes to the museum, he uses Master Jaha's Fumes to combat Heller and Shaw K'Naw. When Ray and Fumes break Heller's gauntlet, Shaw K'Naw turns on Heller. Ray tells Shaw K'Naw that revenge isn't part of the Light Civilization's way and returns him to the Creature World. Heller is knocked out by Fumes as Ray leaves Heller for the police. While in jail, Heller is approached by the Choten, who "offers him a job," which Heller accepts. In the fight against the Choten at his hideout, Heller is sucked into the Creature World with the Choten, Master Nigel, and Fingers.

Master Nigel Brightmore
Master Nigel Brightmore (voiced by John DiMaggio in a British accent) – A Duel Master, he is an expert on the Light Civilization and a master strategist. His creature partner is Ra-Vu, Seeker of Lightning. As the leader of the Council of Masters, Nigel guides the Order of the Kaijudo Duel Masters in their efforts to maintain the Veil to protect Earth from the Creature World and from the Choten. Unimpressed with Ray and his friends, he is appreciative of their talents (especially Gabe's intelligence). He was the Light Duel Master when the Choten was still in the order. By the episode "The Rising" Part 1, Master Nigel decides to side with The Choten because of his strong belief in the original Duel Master code of conduct between humans and Kaiju. He could not allow the creatures to enter Earth, and he would rather accept the Choten's flawed motivations than deal with the chaos that has resulted from breaking the code. Ray, Allie, and Gabe have violated the Duel Master code on several occasions in order to do what is good and logical, rather than what is lawful to the code. His attachment to the rules has blinded him to what is really important in life. As a result, he chooses to join the Choten. Master Nigel is defeated by Master Jaha and is sucked into the Creature World with the Choten, Fingers, and Heller. Afterwards, Gabe is elected to be Master Nigel's temporary successor due to his connection with Sasha, Channeler of Light, until other arrangements can be made. In the episode "Caught in the Spotlight", Master Nigel evolves Ra-Vu into Ra-Vu the Stormbringer so that the Choten can demonstrate the Evolution Serum's effect to Alex. During the fight at Carnahan Family house in the woods, Master Nigel is surprised to find that Ra-Vu has the power of speech in this form. Master Nigel secretly regrets having to evolve his creature under The Choten's orders. In "The Evolution Will Not Be Televised," Master Nigel turns against the Choten since Master Nigel only wanted order in the Duel Masters. This led to his fight with Master Tiera where both of them ended up falling into the transportation ley lines in the Duel Master Temple taking each of them to another location.

Alex
Alexander "Alex" Carnahan (voiced by Andrew Kishino) – Alex is the father of Carny and helps to run the city of San Campion. Alex is continuously disappointed at Carny when he gets into trouble at school. When Ray plans to use Tatsurion the Unchained to set Alex straight, Tatsurion and Ray are surprised that Alex knows everything about them when Alakshmi and the Choten's henchmen arrive. Alex reveals that he is the Choten's largest benefactor and one of his silent partners. When Ray and Tatsurion the Unchained end up in the Fire Civilization with Carny, Alex is surprised that Carny has come with them. After Carny is returned to Earth, he returns to his dad, who decides that Carny is ready for his gift—one of the Choten's Duel Gauntlets. At the end of the episode "Boosted," the Choten introduces Alex to Nigel as his chief financial benefactor. He directs him to one of Alex's chemical factories, which provide Nigel with a chemical that he places in the Duel Masters' spy system so that they would not spot the Choten and/or his allies. In the episode "Caught in the Spotlight," the Choten discusses Alex's plot to be a war profiteer by mass-producing his Evolution Serum. After Lucy leaks footage of Carny and Simian Trooper Grash on the Internet, Alex tries unsuccessfully to reach Carny, and sends Fingers and Heller to bring Carny to him.  When Ray fights hard against Fingers, Heller, and Master Nigel, Alex breaks up the fight with Sword Horned. He orders Carny into the car so that the Choten can have Carny return to his base to be further trained and disciplined.

Carny
"Carny" Carnahan (voiced by Phil LaMarr) – Carny is a school bully who often picks on Ray, Gabe, and Allie.  When Carny and his friends corner the three friends in an alley, Ray unknowingly summons a Rumbling Terrasaur, which scares off Carney and his friends. In the episode "Like Father, Like Son," it is revealed that Carny is verbally abused by his father Alex. When Carny ends up with Ray and Tatsurion the Unchained in the Fire Civilization, Carny and Ray form a truce in order to evade Lord Skycrusher's bounty hunters and return to Earth. After Carny is retrieved from the Fire Civilization by Master Nadia Lobachevsky and Master Benjirou Kimora, he runs off. Ray lets him go as he tells the two Duel Masters that Carny's dad is one of The Choten's benefactors. Carny returns to his dad, who decides that Carny is ready for his gift—one of Choten's Duel Gauntlets. In the episode "The Unbearable Being of Lightness," Carny is trained by Alakshmi in the operation of the Duel Gauntlets. When Carny plans to target Sasha, Channeler of Light, he ends up fighting Gabe. Carny is defeated by Gabe and gets away. In the episode "Caught in the Spotlight," Carny accidentally gets Simian Trooper Grash sighted by Lucy, compelling him to flee before his father can deal with him. While hiding out in the Carnahan Family's house in the woods, Carny is defended by Ray when Heller, Fingers, and Master Nigel target Carny. The battle is broken up by Alex, who has Carny sent to The Choten's base to be further trained and disciplined.

Master Tiera
Master Tiera (voiced by Kari Wahlgren in armored form, Alanna Ubach in normal form) – She was the Fire Duel Master before Master Hector Chavez and the girlfriend of The Choten. In "Duel Hard," Saguru receives a memory fragment from the Choten. In this memory fragment, Master Tiera is seen jumping off a cliff after her partner Meteor Dragon betrays her. It is presumed that she has perished while the circumstances of Meteor Dragon's betrayal are unknown. It turned out that she is alive and had been placed in a cursed mana-dampening armor when she tried to control the Fire Mystic. Upon resurfacing as a prisoner of Lord Skycrusher, she has taken Alakshmi in as an apprentice following the destruction of the Volcano Warship in the first part of the Fire Civilization's war with the Water Civilization. Both of them were recaptured a second time following the conflict at Black-Ridge Volcano. Lord Skycrusher plans to make use of Alakshmi and Master Tiera. In "Bring Me the Head of Tatsurion the Unchained," Master Tiera has trained Alakshmi to cross the Veil. Following Moorna's failure to destroy Tatsurion, Alakshmi uses her veil-crossing ability to get her and Master Tiera away from Lord Skycrusher before he can have Vorg cook Master Tiera. In "Unmasked," Master Tiera joins Alakshmi Verma when she steal a Choten Minion's transport and brings her to the Choten's ship as one of her attempts to free Master Tiera from her mana-dampening armor. When this was a success, Master Tiera stops Alakshmi from taking her revenge. It was revealed that Meteor Dragon "betrayed" Master Tiera when she was unable to control its evolved form and she was thought dead when she actually summoned a smaller creature to save her. Before the Fire Mystic placed a mana-dampening armor on Master Tiera where she remained in the Fire Civilization for 20 years, it repaired her damaged gauntlet. Following Alakshmi being taken out of the Choten's base by Master Isao, Ray, Gabe, and Allie, Master Tiera stays by the Choten's side. In "The Evolution Will Not Be Televised," Master Nigel turns against The Choten which led to his fight with Master Tiera where both of them ended up falling into the transportation ley lines in the Duel Master Temple taking each of them to another location.

Choten Minions
Choten Minions (voiced by Dee Bradley Baker, John DiMaggio, Oded Fehr, Andrew Kishino, Jason Marsden, Rachel Robinson, David Sobolov and Scott Wolf) – The generic foot soldiers of the Choten. The Choten Minions come in large numbers from everywhere on Earth. They always carry out the errands of the Choten.

Supporting characters
 Ken Takahashi Okamoto/Saguru (voiced by Andrew Kishino) – Saguru is a mysterious person with a missing right eye who has the knowledge to navigate around the Creature Realms, including the knowledge of hundreds of passages through the Realms. His creature partner is Humonculon. Because of his unknown past, Saguru is working for The Choten in exchange for The Choten's help in discovering his past. The first memory that Saguru recovers is when he came from Earth after he handed over the Sword of Fiery Cataclysm to The Choten. In the two-part episode "The Deep End," Saguru helps Ray, Allie, and Gabe get to the Water Civilization so that Ray can get his memories back from the Mother Virus after Choten's Memory Swarm removed Ray's memories. Once inside the capital of the Water Civilization, Gargle has the guards remand Saguru to the dungeon. During the group's escape, Ray has Saguru freed. While the guards are busy chasing after Ray's group, Saguru makes his way to the Mother Virus as Aqua Seneschal tells him that the Memory Swarm used by Choten is not associated with the Mother Virus. After The Choten fails to gain control over the Helm of Ultimate Technology, Saguru helps him and Aqua Seneschal escape the Water Civilization in exchange for his next memory. The second memory that he recovers is that he is a former Nature Civilization Duel Master and an old friend of The Choten. In the episode "The Nature of Things" Part 2, Saguru poses as a Snow Faerie in order to enter the Nature Civilization's tournament where the prize is the Shield of Unity. During the final round, Aqua Seneschal crashes the round and steals the Shield of Unity, causing Ray, Tatsurion, Saguru, and the other Nature Civilization creatures pursue him. After the Shield of Unity falls into the Darkness Civilization during the scuffle, The Choten is not pleased with Saguru failing in the tournament and crushes one of the Memory Swarms. Saguru realizes that The Choten is not the friend he knew in the past. Saguru is forced to work with him for his remaining memories. In the episode "Duel Hard," Choten sends Saguru to help Alakshmi and Heller hold up a bank, where the two pieces of the Helm of Ultimate Technology are held. Saguru succeeds in his mission, and Alakshmi and Heller fail. When Saguru asks why they have to fight the Duel Masters, The Choten tells them that they are misguided, and he gives Saguru the Memory Swarm that contains the memories about what happened the day that Master Tiera was betrayed by Meteor Dragon (the creature she has chosen), and the day when Master Toji lost part of his left leg to Snapclaw. The Choten also returns to Saguru his Duel Gauntlet. In the episode "Betrayal," Saguru accompanies The Choten, Alakshmi, Fingers, and Heller to attack Ray's apartment. When The Choten plans to have the apartment taken down, Saguru objects and secretly destroys the Summoning Inhibitor. Saguru saves Ray, Gabe, Allie, and Sasha, Channeler of Light when The Choten summons Flametropus to level Ray's apartment building and brings them to his place in the Nature Civilization. Saguru informs Ray that The Choten holds his memories hostage, and gives Ray the coordinates of The Choten's base in San Campion Bay, telling him that he was one of the Duel Masters. At the Nexus point of the Five Civilizations, Tatsurion the Unchained and Sasha, Channeler of Light collapse as Saguru saves the lives of the humans. Saguru gets Sasha, Channeler of Light away from the Nexus and claims the Heart of Light from her. He hands it over to The Choten, and is given the Memory Swarm that reveals the memory that he was once Ken Okamoto, married to Janet Pierce-Okamoto and that Ray is his son. Devastated to realize that via The Choten's using him he has betrayed his own child, Saguru retaliates, is knocked out by Trox and incarcerated. In the episode "The Rising" Part 1, Saguru uses Humonculon to break open his helmet and free Tatsurion. Aqua Seneschal intervenes and shoots Saguru, Tatsurion the Unchained, and Homonculon with the evolution serum where Humonculon's evolution binds him to Saguru. When Ray enters The Choten's hideout, he finds Saguru in his hybrid state (referred to in the cards as Humonguru) until The Choten arrives. Saguru rises to his feet and helps Ray fight a mind-controlled Tatsurion the Unchained. While Ray tries to get through to Tatsurion, Saguru deals with The Choten until The Choten uses the Shield of Unity to order Humonculon to throw Saguru back into the cargo bay. Crashing to the cargo bay floor, Humonculon is banished to the Creature Realm, taking Saguru with him, since they are bound together. In the episode "The Rising" Part 2, Saguru and Humonculon lie comatose at the shores of the Water Civilization as Saguru's body is placed in a special underwater suit before being dragged underwater by a Water Civilization creature. In "The King's Speech" episode, Saguru is revealed to be alive. He helps Finbarr get Ray, Gabe, and Allie to the Darkness Civilization when King Tritonus' is under The Choten's control. The Water Civilization creature that found Saguru in a coma works for Finbarr and it is revealed that Saguru has just awakened from a coma. Ray works with Saguru and Reef Prince Glu-urrgle to infiltrate the Choten's ship to expose The Choten's control of King Tritonus. After the failed mission, Saguru tells Ray that he cannot return to Earth, since Humonculon binding to him has made him more creature than human. Ray vows to find a way to return his father back to normal, which leads Ray to seek out each of the Creature Mystics to find one of them who might know a spell that can separate Saguru from Humonculon. Over time, the fusion of Saguru and Humonculon causes more of Humonculon to slowly take over Saguru's mind and body. In "Bargain," The Choten tricks Raiden into giving him the Spell of Liquid Compulsion from the Water Mystic in exchange for the antidote for the Evolution Serum to be used on Saguru (who is almost transformed into a humanoid spider-like creature). Unfortunately, the antidote doesn't work on human/creature hybrids as The Choten uses the spell to take control of Saguru much to the dismay of Master Nigel Brightmore and Master Tiera. During that time, Saguru is seen trying to fight Humonculon's control. In "The Evolution Will Not Be Televised," Saguru fights the Choten's control and helps to subdue him. Though the Choten escapes upon banishing Saguru. By the end of the episode, Raiden summons Saguru and Humonculon where he uses the power within him to restore both of them to normal. Afterwards, Ken is reunited with his family.
 Janet Pierce-Okamoto (voiced by Grey DeLisle) – Janet is Ray's mother. The episode "Betrayal" reveals that Janet was once a Kaijudo practitioner when Choten and his minions laid siege to Ray's apartment. After Ray frees Janet from a Cyber Virus, she tells Ray that his father was a Duel Master and that he taught her how to duel in the Nature Civilization where Ray was born. In the episode "The Rising" Part 1, Janet tells the Duel Masters about Master Ken Takahashi Okamoto, the Nature Duel Master before Master Kimora. Master Ken was Janet's husband who married her while he was a Duel Master. While Janet was pregnant with Ray, The Choten and his forces attacked their home. Master Ken's gauntlet was damaged in the fight, but he was able to open the Veil and took Janet with him to escape. Janet gave birth to Ray in the Nature Civilization and when Ray was a toddler, Master Ken was able to repair the Gauntlet. As the family was preparing to return to Earth, The Choten found them and attacked. Master Ken opened the Veil to Earth and Janet and baby Ray went through, but Master Ken closed the Veil to prevent The Choten from following them. In the episode "The Rising" Part 2, Janet pilots the Rumbling Terrasaur when she joins up with the other Duel Masters.
 Grandpa Raiden Okamoto (voiced by Andrew Kishino) – The grandfather of Ray, the father of Ken, and father-in-law of Janet. His grandson was named after him.
 Isao Okamoto (voiced by Keone Young) – The great-uncle of Ray, older brother of Raiden, and uncle of Ken (Saguru). He is a Light Specialist of the Duel Masters who resides in Japan. In "Exchange Program," he accepted the offer to become the new Light Civilization Duel Master, despite initially rejecting it earlier.
 Arthur "Artie" Underhill (voiced by Dee Bradley Baker) – Arthur is the father of Allison. He works as a bank manager.
 Piper Underhill (voiced by Kari Wahlgren) – Allison's mother. A picture of her with her husband and Allison is seen on the yacht Allison's father maintains. In an encounter with the Choten in episode 16, Allison is told by him that her mother ran away from home and that her father was weak. Piper's fate is currently not clear. In "Duel Hard", it is revealed that Allison does not like her mother. In the episode "Heart of Darkness" Pt. 1, it is revealed that Allison was young when Piper ran away. In addition, Megaria the Collector assumed Piper's form in order to get Allie on her side, but Megaria ultimately fails. By the end of the episode "Heart of Darkness" Pt. 2, Allison makes peace with her mother by peeling the packaging tape off from Piper in the family picture on her bedroom wall. In "Gargle, Gargle, Toil and Trouble," Piper returns into Allie's life and tries to reconnect with her. Arthur Underhill later convinces Allie to give her a chance where she left Allie a present containing a mask. In "Darkness on the Edge of Town," it is revealed that Piper is actually Megaria in disguise.
 Denise Wallace (voiced by Kari Wahlgren) – Denise is the mother of Gabe, Donald, and Ronald.
 Phillip Wallace (voiced by Phil LaMarr) – Phillip is the father of Gabe, Donald, and Ronald.
 Donald Wallace (voiced by Phil LaMarr) – Donald is the son of Denise and Phillip Wallace, the brother of Gabe, and the twin brother of Ronald.
 Ronald Wallace (voiced by Phil LaMarr) – Ronald is the son of Denise and Phillip Wallace, the brother of Gabe, and the twin brother of Donald.
 Toji (voiced by John DiMaggio) – Toji is the blacksmith of the Kaijudo Temple. Toji was once a skilled Duel Master until he was injured in an accident when he tried to ride a Snapclaw. The injury resulted in him having a metal peg-leg replacing the original lower part of his left leg. He is talented at forging new Duel Gauntlets and repairing Duel Gauntlets that are damaged. In "The Rising" Pt. 2, Toji and the acolytes join up with the Duel Masters and Janet in order to close the veil before the creatures can get through.
 Tareq (voiced by Dee Bradley Baker) – An acolyte at the Kaijudo Temple.
 Vice Principal Spang (voiced by Dee Bradley Baker) – The vice-principal at San Campion Middle School.
 Coach Harper (voiced by David Sobolov) – The strict gym teacher at San Campion Middle School.
 Mr. Boyd (voiced by Phil LaMarr) – A teacher at San Campion Middle School.
 Nickles (voiced by James Arnold Taylor) – A student and one of Carny's friends.
 Sykes (voiced by Dee Bradley Baker) – A student and one of Carny's friends.
 Lucy (voiced by Alanna Ubach) – A classmate of Ray, Gabe, and Allie.  In the episode "Caught in the Spotlight," Lucy discovers the truth about the Kaijudo arts, which she keeps secret from everyone else, since Ray, Gabe, and Allie don't want the Duel Masters to find out the truth. In the episode "Extracurricular Activities," Lucy learns how to use a Duel Gauntlet and becomes an acolyte of the Duel Masters.
 Maribel (voiced by Grey DeLisle) – A classmate of Ray, Gabe, and Allie.
 Portia (voiced by Kari Wahlgren in the first appearance, Alanna Ubach in the second appearance and thereafter) – A classmate of Ray, Gabe, and Allie.
 Alakshmi Verma (voiced by Grey DeLisle in an Indian accent) – A young Brahmin duelist, Alakshmi is one of The Choten's allies and his favorite warrior. Her creature partner is Razorkinder Puppet of Miasma Pit. Alakshmi is a formidable threat to the effort of keeping the balance between human and creature kind in place. She is a very single-minded Kaijudo duelist, cool and calculating with a definite dark side. Not only is Alakshmi skilled in battle and a serious challenge for the heroes, but her beauty is intimidating and distracting to the boys, which is very irritating to Allie. In the episode "Heart of Darkness" Part 2, it is revealed that Alakshmi's mother Padma may have sold Alakshmi to The Choten. In the episode "Heavenly Creatures," Alakshmi has personal issues with the Light Civilization, because one of its creatures destroyed her ancestral village. In the fight against The Choten at his hideout, Alakshmi turns against The Choten in order to reverse the mana flow. Following the fight to restore the Veil, Alakshmi is sucked into the Creature Realm and is a prisoner of the Fire Civilization. During Alakshmi's time as a prisoner of Lord Skycrusher, she is trained by a full armored, hooded robed human that turns out to be Master Tiera following the destruction of the Volcano Warship in the first part of the Fire Civilization's war with the Water Civilization. Both of them are recaptured following the conflict at Black-Rim Volcano. Lord Skycrusher plans to make use of Alakshmi and Master Tiera. In "Bring Me the Head of Tatsurion the Unchained," Alakshmi has been used by Lord Skycrusher to summon fleeing spies for captures while learning the veil-crossing spell. She is then ordered to use Moorna into leading Tatsurion into a trap by capturing Headstrong Wanderer (though Alakshmi did tip of Ray beforehand). After Moorna's plot to have Brutalus get revenge on Tatsurion didn't work, Alakshmi used the veil-crossing spell to rescue Master Tiera as they successfully escape from Lord Skycrusher's castle. In "Unmasked," Alakshmi steals a Choten Minion's transport and takes Master Tiera to The Choten's ship in order to use the technology their as an attempt to get the mana-dampening armor off of Master Tiera. Following a power surge, Alakshmi arrives and uses Razorkinder to pin down the Choten in order to get her revenge on him. This was thwarted by Master Tiera as Master Isao gets her and the children away from the Choten. In "Dueling Partners," Alakshmi comes to the Duel Masters Temple for help when she is being hunted by the Choten's minions. Alakshmi helps Allie when it comes to stopping Master Nigel Brightmore into using a Cyborg Samurai with a Rumbling Terrasaur horn on its drill bit to break through the Veil and flood the Darkness Civilization. After that plot was thwarted, Alakshmi ends up becoming a probationary acolyte of the Duel Masters Temple.

Creatures
The following creatures, which come from the five different civilizations, were either originally featured in the original Kaijudo franchise in recolored and renamed form, or are exclusive to this franchise.

Creature Partners
 Tatsurion the Unchained (voiced by David Sobolov) – An Armored Dragon/Beast Kin that is associated with the Fire and Nature Civilizations. He is Ray's creature partner and has been nicknamed "Bob." It is revealed that his mother Headstrong Wanderer is from the Quillspike Tribe of the Beast Kin and his father Napalmion the Conquering is from the Armored Dragons.  His brothers in his Quillspike family, Razor-Hide and Prickle-Back, nicknamed him Bare-Bottom (most likely a reference to the fact that he has so few quills). He is also revealed to be a fugitive of the Fire Civilization with a bounty on his head after he attacked a dragon that was attacking the Nature Civilization (more specifically the Quillspike Tribe). Before the final attack on The Choten's base, Tatsurion is captured by the Choten's summoning machine. He is later injected with the Choten's evolutionary serum, which evolves him into Evo Fury Tatsurion. In this form, Tatsurion sprouts wings that grant him flight. For his role in freeing Infernus the Immolator his fugitive status is lifted and he is accorded the standing of a full-blooded dragon. 
 Scaradorable of Gloom Hollow – A koala-like Chimera that is associated with the Darkness Civilization. She is Allie's partner and has been nicknamed "Squeaky." Squeaky's kind live in a set of caves called Gloom Hollow and they can assume their Hunter forms by taking their body inside-out. She is the runt of the litter whom Allie saved from being sacrificed as a meal. When exposed to the Evolve Spell, Scaradorable can evolve into Shapeshifter Scaradorable who can change parts of its body into the parts of other creatures.
 Reef Prince Glu-urrgle (voiced by Dee Bradley Baker) – A Cyber Lord that is associated with the Water Civilization. He is Gabe's partner and has been nicknamed "Gargle." Upon downloading the contents in Gabe's PDA, Reef Prince Glu-urrgle learned how to speak English and speaks in online chat terms. Reef Prince Glu-urrgle can convert any tools and scraps into different inventions like a fire extinguishing device, a vacuum cleaner-like device, a Hovercraft (featured in the card game under the title of Hovercraft Glu-urrgle), a mechanical jack device, a sonic amplifier, a pedal-powered hot air balloon, a binoculars-like device, a potato gun (featured in the card game under the title of Potato Gun Glu-urgle), a gem shield, a gun that shoots hydrogen sulfide bubbles, a helicopter device, a gatling gun, a beam cannon, a device to serve as a tribute to Megaria, an artifact detector, and a protection field. When Gabe befriended Sasha, Channeler of Light, Reef Prince Glu-urrgle is shown to develop jealousy for her until the part where it came to restoring the Veil. When exposed to the Evolve Spell, Reef Prince Glu-urrgle can evolve into Glu-urrgle 2.0 which resembles six small versions of Reef Prince Glu-urrgle.
 Sasha, Channeler of Light (voiced by Kari Wahlgren) – An Angel Command from the Light Civilization and princess of the Light Civilization. She is Gabe's second partner creature. It is revealed that the Archangels of the Light Civilization hid the Heart of Light within Sasha. She is this franchise's version of Sasha, Channeler of Suns (who was a Mecha Del Sol).
 Ra-Vu, Seeker of Lightning (voiced by James Arnold Taylor) – A Skyforce Champion that is associated with the Light Civilization. He is Master Nigel Brightmore's partner. Using The Choten's Evolution Serum, Master Nigel Brightmore evolves Ra-Vu into Ra-Vu the Stormbringer where he gains the power of speech. Though loyal to Nigel, Ra-Vu is opposed to their service to the Choten.
 Mighty Shouter (voiced by Scott Wolf) – An elephant-like Beast Kin that is associated with the Nature Civilization. Mighty Shouter is the protector and shaman of the Bronze-Arm Tribe. He once lost half his tusks following a Bladefish attack, but they were restored when Raiden used the Spell of Swift Regeneration to restore the horns of the Rumbling Terrasaurs. He is Master Benjirou Kimora's partner.
 Gilaflame the Assaulter – A Drakon who that is associated with the Fire Civilization. He is Master Hector Chavez' partner. When exposed to the Evolve Spell, Gilaflame becomes Blazetrail Gilaflame which is a four-armed version of himself. He is this franchise's version of Pyrofighter Magnus.
 Black Feather of Shadow Abyss – A Specter that is associated with the Darkness Civilization. He is Master Jaha's partner. He is this franchise's version of Black Feather, Shadow of Rage.
 Aqua Chaser, Rusalka – A Trench Hunter that is associated with the Water Civilization. He is Master Nadia Lobachevsky's partner.
 Aqua Seneschal (voiced by Phil LaMarr) – A Cyber Lord that is associated with the Water Civilization. He is The Choten's partner and second-in-command. Ever-vigilant steward and deadly servant, Aqua Seneschal manages the Choten's operations from behind his many computer consoles. When more direct action is needed, Aqua Seneschal can form a pair of ice-sword arms to deal with pesky opponents, use his body circuitry for covert mobile data retrieval, or make a complete character judgment about someone (usually poor) with one sweep of his eye scan. When Tatsurion the Unchained asked him what kind of creature betrays his own kind as seen in "The Taken," Aqua Seneschal replied that Tatsurion isn't his part of his kind. Ray later learns how to summon him after being lured into a deal with the Choten, but later uses this to infiltrate the Choten's base. Seeing Seneschal as a liability due to this, the Choten has Squillace Scourge attack him, leading to Seneschal's apparent demise.
 Trox, General of Destruction – A Shadow Champion that is associated with the Darkness Civilization. He resembles a four-armed demon with a snake tail instead of legs. Trox joined up with The Choten to assist in his goals.
 Razorkinder Puppet of Miasma Pit (voiced by Grey DeLisle) – An Evil Toy that is associated with the Darkness Civilization. He is Alaksmi Verma's partner.
 Humonculon the Blaster – An Enforcer/Megabug that is associated with the Light and Nature Civilizations. It is a small, golden robotic spider that is Saguru's partner and mostly resides in Saguru's mechanical eye providing the laser attacks. During the attack on The Choten's base, both Humonculon and Saguru are hit with the Choten's evolutionary serum causing the two of them to fuse into a hybrid form (referred to in the cards as Humonguru). The progress of the further combination causes Humonculon to slowly take over Saguru's mind and body. Eventually, the final process turns both of them into a humanoid spider-like creature. In "The Evolution Will Not Be Televised," Raiden uses the power within him to restore Saguru and Humonculon back to normal.
 Prism-Blade Enforcer – An Enforcer that is associated with the Light Civilization. It is used by Isao Okamoto to fight Sniper Mosquito. It is Isao's primary creature partner.

Creature Monarchs
The Creature Monarchs are the rulers of the five Creature Civilizations. The Creature Monarchs are shown to be immune to the effects of the Null Zone (a neutral area between the Five Creature Civilizations that can drain mana from any creatures). They banded together with Five Wizards when a war between the humans and the monsters threatened both worlds. The Creature Monarchs sacrificed some of their Mana so that the original Duel Masters can create a veil that has since separated the human and creature worlds. With little energy left, the Creature Monarchs fell into a deep slumber. It appears the plan was originally to allow the Creature Monarchs to recover their strength and awaken before sending them across the Veil so they might rule their civilization again. At some point in the Creature Monarchs' history following the two worlds being separated, the Order of the Kaijudo Duel Masters betrayed the Creature Monarchs' trust where they periodically siphoned off their mana and kept them in hibernation for a millennium as experienced when Ray used his mana on the Fire Civilization's King. This information surprised Master Hector Chavez and Master Benjirou Kimura. If the Veil collapses, the Five Creature Monarchs will be reawakened and continue what they began thousands of years ago. The Choten later awakened the Creature Monarchs in a plot to bring down the Veil. This plan was thwarted when the Duel Masters and their allies concentrated their Mana to repair the Veil and send the Creature Monarchs back to the Creature World. After engaging in conflict, all five Monarchs meet for a summit at the instigation of the Duel Masters only to end up comatose due to the Mana draining properties of the region.

 Infernus the Immolator (voiced by John DiMaggio) – A giant Armored Dragon that is associated with the Fire Civilization. His wings are large enough to shade an entire city in their shadow. It was from Infernus the Immolator that Ray learned the truth on what happened when the original Duel Masters put them into a hibernation. Infernus the Immolator gave Ray a gift of advanced mana which evolved his Duel Gauntlet. Upon being awakened by the Choten, Infernus the Immolator is summoned to the Choten. When Allie claims the Sword of Fiery Cataclysm, Ray returns it to Infernus the Immolator. Infernus remembers Ray and agrees to duel with him to stop the Choten. When the Veil is restored, Infernus the Immolator is returned to the Fire Civilization as he tells Lord Skycrusher to send word to all Fire Civilization Creatures that they are going to war. Following the incident with the Water Civilization in the first part of the war, Infernus the Immolator has pardoned Tatsurion the Unchained of his previous crimes in return for saving Lord Skycrusher from his falling volcano warship and for Ray returning his sword.
 King Tritonus (voiced by James Arnold Taylor) – A Leviathan that is the ruler of the Water Civilization. It resembles a giant cybernetic combination of a jellyfish and an octopus. Upon being awakened by the Choten, King Tritonus is summoned to the Choten. When the Veil is restored, King Tritonus is returned to the Water Civilization. King Tritonus later fell under the control of The Choten who used the Helm of Ultimate Technology on him in order to further his goals. The Choten even used King Tritonus to form the Loyalty Police, had Milporo incarcerated, and Reef Prince Glu-urrgle exiled from the Water Civilization. In "Clash of the Monarchs," Ray uses the Mana Ticks that came with Roaming Bloodmane to attack the Choten enough for King Tritonus to be freed from the Choten's control.
 Almighty Colossus – A Colossus that is the ruler of the Nature Civilization. He has two horns on his head, four arms, a landscape on his body, and he has small mandibles in his mouth. Upon being awakened by the Choten, Almighty Colossus is summoned to the Choten. When the Veil is restored, Almighty Colossus is returned to the Nature Civilization. In "Mixed Vegetables", it is revealed that Almighty Colossus can give off a lot of mana to the Nature Civilization's ground simply by walking all over it....which explained why the plants were growing out of control on both sides of the Veil. In "Fallout", Almighty Colossus regains the Shield of Unity so that he can rally the Nature Civilization.
 Queen Kalima (voiced by Alanna Ubach) – A Dark Lord that is the ruler of the Darkness Civilization. She has the purple and black appearance of a giant-sized purple chimeric dragon with wings for arms. Upon being awakened by the Choten, Queen Kalima is summoned to the Choten. When the Veil is restored, Queen Kalima is returned to the Darkness Civilization. In "Dueling Partners," the Choten and Master Tiera meet with Queen Kalima where they try to trick her into going to war with the Light Civilization. Due to the seeds of suspicion sewed by the Choten, Queen Kalima decides to go to war with the Light Civilization and sets up a foothold in San Campion. In "Brainjacked", Queen Kalima starts her campaign to invade San Campion with Gregoria leading the invasion. Allie leads Ray, Gabe, and Master Jaha into a meeting with Queen Kalima where Allie uses the Cloak of Dark Illusion to get Queen Kalima to listen to her. With help from Sasha, Allie convinces Queen Kalima to call off the invasion where Allie returns the Cloak of Dark Illusion to her. Afterwards, Queen Kalima shows some respect for Allie and calls off her invasion of San Campion, for now. She is referred to as Queen Kalima of the Infinite Dark in the TV series.
 Eternal Haven – An enormous Angel Command that is the ruler of the Light Civilization. She resembles a giant transformable UFO with seemingly-detachable angelic beings upon her frame. Upon being awakened by the Choten, Eternal Haven is summoned to the Choten. When the Veil is restored, Eternal Haven is returned to the Light Civilization. In "Exchange Program", Eternal Haven initiated a study of humankind that involved replacing abducted citizens with Light creatures while they were mentally reprogrammed to be more orderly. Fortunately, Gabe and Sasha were able to convince her to allow humankind the capacity to experience free will. She is referred to as Eternal Haven, Angelic Liege in the TV series.

Other creatures
 Aeropica – A Trench Hunter that is associated with the Water Civilization. Master Chavez summons an Aeropica in order to get to Corile's outpost.
 Alcadeus, Winged Justice – A Skyforce Champion that is associated with the Light Civilization. It is this franchise's version of Alcadeus, Lord of Spirits (which is an Angel Command and an evolution creature).
 Ambush Scorpion – A Megabug that is associated with the Nature Civilization. It resembles a giant scorpion.
 Angler Cluster – An Undertow Engine that is associated with the Water Civilization. Allie and Gabe commandeer one to rescue imperiled Water creatures.
 Armor-Skin Fish – A Trench Hunter that is associated with the Water Civilization. It is this franchise's version of Solidskin Fish.
 Aqua-Ranger Commander (voiced by Andrew Kishino) – An evolved Aquan that is associated with the Water Civilization that works for Corile.
 Aqua-Ranger Sonora – An Aquan that is associated with the Water Civilization. He works as a spy for the Water Civilization. In "Bring Me the Head of Tatsurion the Unchained," Aqua-Ranger Sonora was in the middle of a heist on the Water Civilization's behalf until Alakshmi Verma summoned it to Lord Skycrusher's throne room before he could escape into the water. Aqua-Ranger Sonora was then apprehended by the guards.
 Aqua-Reflector Nomulos – An Aquan that is associated with the Water Civilization. It resembles an armored centaur with a whip-like tail. It is this franchise's version of Crystal Paladin (which was an evolution creature).
 Aqua Rider – An Aquan that is associated with the Water Civilization. The Aqua Riders serve as the foot soldiers of the Waters Civilization's armies.
 Aqua Trickster – A Corrupted Aquan that is associated with the Water Civilization. They work for Aqua-Ranger Commander. In "Fallout," some Aqua Tricksters assisted in Master Nigel Brightmore's plot to use an evolved version of Finbarr's Dreadnought to siphon the waters from San Campion's reservoir and flood the Nature Civilization.
 Arachnoir of Cobweb Cavern – A Brain Jacker that is associated with the Darkness Civilization, resembling a hybrid of a spider and a scorpion. Master Jaha summons it to assist her, Master Kimora, and Earthstomp Giant to prevent a nearby cliff from breaking.
 Argus, Vigilant Seer – A Battle Sphere that is associated with the Light Civilization. He is this franchise's version of Lah, Purification Enforcer.
 Armored Guard (voiced by David Sobolov and Scott Wolf) – An unidentified creature that is associated with the Darkness Civilization. They serve as the guards of Megaria.
 Assault Dragon – An Armored Dragon that is associated with the Fire Civilization. A group of Assault Dragons capture Ray and Tatsurion the Unchained, and bring them to the Volcano Warship run by Lord Skycrusher.
 Badlands Lizard – A Dune Gecko that is associated with the Fire Civilization. The Badlands Lizards are easily tamed and carry cargo for Drakon traders.
 Beliqua the Ascender – An Invader that is associated with the Light Civilization. Master Jaha summons it to prevent a truck and its driver from going over the edge of a collapsing bridge.
 Blade-Rush Wyvern – An Attack Raptor that is associated with the Fire Civilization. It serves as a mode of transportation for the Drakons.
 Bladefish – A Trench Hunter that is associated with the Water Civilization. The Choten and his followers used the Bladefish to harvest the Rumbling Terrasaurs. The Bladefish are also responsible for why Mighty Shouter is missing half his tusks.
 Blastforge Slaver (voiced by Phil LaMarr) – A Drakon that is associated with the Fire Civilization. He runs the slave pits of Blastforge City for Lord Skycrusher. He is this franchise's version of Deadly Fighter Braid Claw.
 Blaze Belcher – A Burn Belly that is associated with the Fire Civilization.
 Om Nom Nom – A clone of Blaze Belcher. It ate other Burn Belly clones and mutated.
 Blinder Beetle – An Enforcer that is associated with the Light Civilization. When exposed to the Evolve Spell, it becomes Blinder Beetle Prime who has a more insect-like appearance. It is this franchise's version of Chen Treg, Vizier of Blades.
 Bloodsucker Plant – A Wild Veggie that is associated with the Darkness and Nature Civilizations. It resembles a four-eyed eggplant with arms and legs. Anyone who travels through the Nature Civilization is often plagued by Bloodsucker Plants, which quietly attach themselves to their victim's back and begin to slowly drain the victim's mana. It is this franchise's version of Geo Eggplant (which was also an Alien in the original franchise).
 Bolgash Dragon – An Armored Dragon that is associated with the Fire Civilization. He is the larger version of Bolshack Dragon. Lord Skycrusher summons him to his Colosseum using the Sword of Fiery Cataclysm.
 Bolshack Dragon – An Armored Dragon that is associated with the Fire Civilization.
 Boom Skull – A Dread Mask/Melt Warrior that is associated with the Darkness Civilization and the Fire Civilization. It explodes upon impact. In "Fallout," the Boom Skulls were among the Darkness Civilization creatures that Gregoria led in a plot to invade San Campion so that Queen Kalima can establish a foothold there.
 Branca the Treacherous – A Drakon that is associated with the Fire Civilization. He is the bounty hunter sidekick of Burnclaw the Relentless. He is the Kaijudo version of Branca, Protection Soldier.
 Brave Giant – A Colossus that is associated with the Nature Civilization.
 Broadsword Butterfly – A Megabug that is associated with the Nature Civilization.
 Bronze-Arm Tribe – A group of creatures that are associated with the Nature Civilization.
 Chief Thorn-Bringer (voiced by Phil LaMarr) – A Spirit Totem associated with the Nature Civilization, leader of the Bronze-Arm Tribe.
 Bronze-Arm Champions (voiced by David Sobolov and Scott Wolf) – A group of Beast Kin and common members of the Bronze-Arm Tribe. The Bronze-Arm Champions resemble humanoid horses. They work as farmers until they are attacked, then they can fight as a ferocious horde. Some are captured by Choten's minions to build up the mana, but are later freed amongst other creatures by Ray, Gabe, Allie, and Mighty Shouter.
 Carnivorous Dahlia – A Tree Kin associated with the Nature Civilization, resembling a carnivorous plant, evoking the traits of the Venus flytrap and the Drosera. Carnivorous Dahlia is associated with the Bronze-Arm Tribe and obeys the commands of Chief Thorn-Bringer. It is this franchise's version of Poisonous Dahlia.
 Copper Locust – A Megabug associated with the Nature Civilization. It resembles a giant copper-colored locust. Chief Thorn-Bringer uses the Copper Locust as his mode of transportation.
 Feral Sabretooth – A Beast Kin and a member of the Bronze-Arm Tribe. It resembles a smilodon with a mane and long claws. Alex uses a Feral Sabretooth to fight Ray in order to guard the production of The Choten's Evolution Serum. After Tatsurion the Unchained unknowingly knocks Feral Sabretooth into a vat filled with the Evolution Serum, it evolves into Bronze-Arm Sabretooth and gains another set of arms. Bronze-Arm Sabretooth is this franchise's version of Storm Wrangler, the Furious.
 Brutalus (voiced by Dee Bradley Baker) – An Armored Dragon that is associated with the Fire Civilization. When Brutalus attacked the Quillspike Tribe, Tatsurion the Unchained badly injured Brutalus' left wing which was the reason why a bounty was placed on his head. Due to his broken wing, Brutalus was outcast from the Fire Civilization.
 Buoyant Blowfish – A Trench Hunter that is associated with the Water Civilization.
 Burnclaw the Relentless (voiced by Scott Wolf) – A Drakon that is associated with the Fire Civilization. He is a Drakon bounty hunter that works for Lord Skycrusher.
 Chaotic Skyterror – An Attack Raptor that is associated with the Fire Civilization. It has been used as a mode of transportation for Burnclaw the Relentless and Branca the Treacherous.
 Choten's Stalker Sphere – A Corrupted Enforcer that is associated with the Light Civilization. It resembles a Stalker Sphere with lasers and retractable razor blades.
 Cindermoss Quartz – A Spirit Quartz that is associated with the Fire Civilization and the Nature Civilization. It is this franchise's version of Tagtapp, the Retaliator.
 Citadel Magistrate – A Skyforce Champion that is associated with the Light Civilization.
 Cobalt, the Storm Knight – An Enforcer that is associated with the Light Civilization. He is a decorated Storm Knight who has saved eight citadel cities from destruction. He is this franchise's version of Sieg Balicula, the Intense.
 Cyber Lord Corile (voiced by Grey DeLisle) – A Cyber Lord that is associated with the Water Civilization. Corile resides in an outpost near the Fire Civilization's border and works for Finbarr.
 Council of Logos – A trio of Cyber Lords that govern the Water Civilization.
 Finbarr (voiced by Phil LaMarr) – A Cyber Lord that is associated with the Water Civilization. He is a member of the Council of Logos who works as a battle strategy specialist. Finbarr's job on the Council of Logos is to lead the Water Civilization's armies. When the Choten has King Tritonus under his control, Finbarr became a fugitive and has been working to find a way to keep the effects of Saguru and Humonculon's fusion from spreading.
 Hokira (voiced by Kari Wahlgren) – A Cyber Lord that is associated with the Water Civilization. He is a member of the Council of Logos who works as a knowledge specialist.
 Milporo (voiced by Dee Bradley Baker) – A Cyber Lord that is associated with the Water Civilization. He is a member of the Council of Logos who works as a defense specialist. When The Choten has King Tritonus under his control, Milporo is incarcerated by the Loyalty Police for supposedly committing treachery towards the Water Civilization.
 Dagger Doll – An Evil Toy that is associated with the Darkness Civilization. It served as one of Empress Megaria's servants. It is this franchise's version of Lupa, Poison-Tipped Doll.
 Dawn Giant – A Colossus that is associated with the Nature Civilization. The Dawn Giant is the largest of the Colossi.
 Draglide the Swiftest – An Attack Raptor that is associated with the Fire Civilization. It is this franchise's version of Draglide.
 Dream Pirate – A Specter that is associated with the Darkness Civilization. It resembles a ghostly pirate. Ray uses the Dream Pirate to pass off as the Ghost Pirate of Pelican Cove in order to haunt Allie's sleepover. It is this franchise's version of Dream Pirate, Shadow of Theft.
 Drooling Worm – A Rot Worm that is associated with the Darkness Civilization.
 Earthstomp Giant – A Colossus that is associated with the Nature Civilization.
 Ember-Eye – An Attack Raptor that is associated with the Fire Civilization.
 Essence Elf – A Tree Kin that is associated with the Nature Civilization. The Essence Elves can use their wings to camouflage themselves to look like plants. If threatened, the wings of an Essence Elf can unfold to reveal poison-tipped thorns that can frighten even the strongest creatures.
 Explosive Infantry – A Melt Warrior that is associated with the Fire Civilization.
 Fear Fang – A Beast Kin that is associated with the Nature Civilization. It resembles a werewolf-like creature.
 Finbarr's Dreadnought – A Cyber Complex that is associated with the Water Civilization. It acts as Cyber Lord Finbarr's movable military post. It is heavily damaged in battle with Lord Skycrusher's Volcano-Ship. In "Fallout," an evolved version of Finbarr's Dreadnought was used by Master Nigel Brightmore and the Choten Minions in a plot to siphon the waters in San Campion's reservoir and flood the Nature Civilization. It is this franchise's version of Pinpoint Lunatron.
 Flametropus – A Rock Brute that is associated with the Fire Civilization.
 Flare Inhibitor – An Enforcer that is associated with the Light Civilization.
 Fluorogill Manta – A Trench Hunter that is associated with the Water Civilization. It resembles a manta ray-like creature. The Fluorgill Mantas serve as bodyguards to the Cyber Lords when they venture out of their domed cities.
 Forest Hornet – A Megabug that is associated with the Nature Civilization, it resembles a giant hornet. Master Kimora keeps a Forest Hornet in reserve at the dojo stables for his trips into the Nature Civilization.
 Fumes – A Tarborg that is associated with the Darkness Civilization. It resembles a mud monster. Ray uses this monster to help him fight Heller and Shaw K'Naw. In the series, it has also been called Mudman Fumes when summoned.
 Galsaur Rock Beast – A Rock Brute that is associated with the Fire Civilization.
 Gasbag – A Flying Fungus that is associated with the Nature Civilization.
 Gaunt Boneweaver – A Zombie that is associated with the Darkness Civilization. It looks like a skeletal spider with a skull face. Gaunt Boneweaver acts as one of Megaria's enforcers. It is this franchise's version of Bone Assassin, The Ripper.
 General Charzon – An evolved corrupted Armored Dragon that is associated with the Fire Civilization. In "Siege," General Charzon is among the evolved creatures that The Choten uses to attack San Campion. He is this franchise's version of Garkago Dragon (which isn't an evolution creature in the original franchise).
 Ghost Spy (voiced by Kari Wahlgren) – A Specter that is associated with the Darkness Civilization.
 Gigabolver – A Chimera that is associated with the Darkness Civilization. Gigabolver is among the Darkness Civilization creatures that are loyal to Megaria. In "Brainjacked," a Gigabolver accompanied Gregoria in her invasion on San Campion. It is this franchise's version of Gigabolver.
 Gigargon – A Chimera that is associated with the Darkness Civilization, the Gigargons are constructed from extra parts of whatever is lying around. If a Dark Lord has big enough spare parts and enough mana, he or she can make a Gigargon, which also serves as a Dark Lord's mobile lair. After all, it helps if the fortress can win duels all by itself. Megaria has a Gigargon as her mobile lair.
 Gigastand – A Chimera that is associated with the Darkness Civilization. It is referred to in the TV series as Horrosmash of Wraithpeak when it is used by Heller.
 Gigazanda – A Chimera that is associated with the Darkness Civilization. The Gigazandas are a combination of a lizard, a bird, and a beast.
 Gorgeon, Shadow of Gluttony – A Specter that is associated with the Darkness Civilization. He is this franchise's version of Gray Balloon, Shadow of Greed.
 Granite Avenger – A Colossus that is associated with the Nature Civilization. In the Nature Civilization's tournament, Granite Avenger loses to Saguru (who is disguised as a Snow Sprite).
 Grave Worm – A Rot Worm that is associated with the Darkness Civilization. Each Grave Worm varies in size, depending on from which graveyard they are hatched.
 Gregoria, Princess of Malevolence (voiced by Kari Wahlgren) – A Dark Lord that is associated with the Darkness Civilization. She serves as an ambassador to the Fire Civilization and is the sister of Megaria the Collector. She is known as Gregoria the Malevolent in the card game and is this franchise's version of Gregoria, Princess of War.
 Gregoria's Fortress – A Chimera that is associated with the Darkness Civilization. It is the lair of Gregoria the Malevolent.
 Guardian Akhal-Teek – A Skyforce Champion/Beast Kin that is associated with the Light Civilization and the Nature Civilization. It resembles a Pegasus with two horns. Saguru summons it to duel against the Choten to save everyone aboard Arthur Underhill's boat. It is this franchise's version of Aura Pegasus, Avatar of Life (which is a Pegasus).
 Hammer Dragon Foulbyrn – An Armored Dragon that is associated with the Fire Civilization. Alakshmi uses the Sword of Fiery Cataclysm to summon a Hammer Dragon Foulbyrn to attack Sasha's citadel. It is this franchise's version of Bolbalzak Ex.
 Haven's Elite – A Skyforce Champion that is associated with the Light Civilization. In "Exchange Program," several Haven's Elite appeared alongside Eternal Haven where they serve as her personal escorts and Royal Guards.
 Cyborg Samurai – A Haven's Elite that was used by Master Nighel Brightmore to help the Choten start a war between the Light Civilization and the Darkness Civilization.
 Hazard Crawler – An Earth Eater that is associated with the Water Civilization. Master Nadia summons the Hazard Crawler to eat the rocks that form around Corile's outpost when it is under siege by the Fire Civilization.
 Hydro Initiate – A Cyber Lord that is associated with the Water Civilization. The Hydro Initiates serve as the primary guards of the Water Civilization.
 Hydrobot Crab – An Undertow Engine that is associated with the Water Civilization. It resembles a giant robotic crab, resides on the outskirts of the Water Civilization, and is said to be an experiment of the Cyber Lords that went horribly wrong.
 Impalicus – An evolved Shadow Champion/Zombie that is associated with the Darkness Civilization. The Choten uses his evolution serum on a Writhing Bone Ghoul to turn it into Impalicus so that Fingers can use it to target Ray.
 Jackalax – A Beast Kin that is associated with the Nature Civilization. It is this franchise's version of Crow Winger.
 Jenny, the Dismantling Puppet – An Evil Toy that is associated with the Darkness Civilization. She is one of the Darkness Civilization creatures loyal to Megaria.
 Jetflame Lizard – A Drakon that is associated with the Fire Civilization. Several Jetflame Lizards serve as the bodyguards and Royal Guards of Lord Skycrusher. It is this franchise's version of Hysteria Lizard (which is a Melt Warrior).
 Karate Carrot (voiced by James Arnold Taylor) – A Wild Veggie that is associated with the Nature Civilization. It is seen amongst the slaves on Lord Skycrusher's Volcano-Ship until the slaves were freed by Raiden.
 Kenina the Igniter – A Fire Bird that is associated with the Fire Civilization. It resembles a Phoenix.
 King Bullfang – A Leviathan that is associated with the Water Civilization. It resides in the coldest parts of the Water Civilization.
 King Poseidon – A Leviathan that is associated with the Water Civilization. King Poseidon is as large as an entire city and wanders alone. He will occasionally set course towards the Water Civilization's capital whenever a major battle is about to get underway.
 Knowledge Warden (voiced by David Sobolov) – An Aquan that is associated with the Water Civilization, Knowledge Warden guards the Knowledge Fountain and doesn't allow anyone near it unless they have permission from the Council of Logos. He is this franchise's version of Funky Wizard.
 Captain Orwellia (voiced by Kari Wahlgren) – Captain Orwellia is a Knowledge Warden who is used by King Tritonus (who at the time is under The Choten's control) to form the Water Civilization's Loyalty Police as its police captain. She was first seen incarcerating Milporo for supposedly committing treason against King Tritonus.
 Kolus, Soulshine Enforcer – A Fractal that is associated with the Light Civilization.
 Lars, Virtuous Imager – An Invader that is associated with the Light Civilization.
 Launcher Locust – A Megabug that is associated with the Nature Civilization. The Launcher Locusts are known for the twin cannons mounted on their backs which fire a rocket filled with hundreds of tiny megabugs speeding into enemy lines. It is this franchise's version of Launch Locust.
 Lava Leaper – A Dune Gecko that is associated with the Fire Civilization.
 Legionnaire Lizard – A Dune Gecko that is associated with the Fire Civilization, he is Little Hissy's adult version, and his kind hunt in large packs. They are similar to the armadillos where they curl into a ball.
 Little Hissy – A baby Legionnaire Lizard. He is captured by Alakshmi Verma and aged into Big Hissy by The Choten's machine. Big Hissy is later freed by Ray, Gabe, Allie, and Mighty Shouter amongst the other creatures held captive by The Choten.
 Locomotivator – A Tarborg that is associated with the Darkness Civilization, it resembles a train-like creature. In the series, it is referred to as Locomotivator of Bleak Trestle. It is this franchise's version of Locomotiver.
 Lord Skycrusher (voiced by John DiMaggio) – An Armored Dragon that is associated with the Fire Civilization, Lord Skycrusher is the ruler of Blastforge City. He hires Drakon bounty hunters to capture Tatsurion the Unchained for him, and Saguru hands him, Ray, and Allie. Lord Skycrusher allows Tatsurion the Unchained's plea to fight in the arena in honor of Napalmeon the Conquering. With help from Gabe and Reef Prince Glu-urrgle, Ray, Allie, Tatsurion, and Scaradorable of Gloom Hollow are able to get out of Blastforge City's arena. In the episode "The Rising" Part 2, Lord Skycrusher is present when Infernus the Immolator is returned to the Fire Civilization. Lord Skycrusher is instructed by Infernus the Immolator to gather every Fire Civilization creature in preparation for war. In the "Cease Fire" episode, Lord Skycrusher is in command of a Volcano Warship when Ray and Gabe are captured. In the form of Finbarr, Allie is able to negotiate a parley between Lord Skycrusher and Finbarr, with the parley taking place at Gregoria's fortress. The parley does not go well. In the episode "Boiling Point," Lord Skycrusher's Volcano Warship is destroyed and he is saved. Later, Infernus the Immolator has pardoned Tatsurion the Unchained of his crimes, though Lord Skycrusher is secretly bitter. In the "Quest in Fire" episode, Lord Skycrusher hears about Tatsurion the Unchained heading to Black-Rim Volcano and leads a group of Drakon soldiers to recapture Tatsurion the Unchained. They are repelled when Ray learns the Spell of Absolute Incineration from the Fire Mystic. After Alakshmi and Master Tiera are recaptured, Lord Skycrusher plans to make use of them. In "Fallout," Ray, Allie, Gabe, and Tatsurion find Lord Skycrusher in the ruins of Blastforge City after it was destroyed by the Water Civilization. Lord Skycrusher later helps the kids, Piercing Seer, Gregoria, and Sasha in preventing Master Nigel Brightmore and the Choten Minions from having an evolved version of Finbarr's Dreadnought siphon water from San Campion's reservoir and flooding the Nature Civilization. He is this franchise's version of Sky Crusher, the Agitator (who is a Dragonoid).
 Lumbering Elderwood – A Tree Kin that is associated with the Nature Civilization.
 Luminar – An Enforcer that is associated with the Light Civilization. It can project holograms that can either send messages to allies or fool enemies.
 Magma Dragon Melgars – An Armored Dragon that is associated with the Fire Civilization. It commands the volcanoes of the Fire Civilization by drawing power from the lavas that flow beneath it. Alakshmi uses the Sword of Fiery Cataclysm to summon Magma Dragon Melgars to attack the capital of the Water Civilization. It is this franchise's version of Magmadragon Melgars.
 Man o' Warden – A Cyber Virus that is associated with the Water Civilization. It resembles a jellyfish-like creature.
 Mana Tick – A Megabug that is associated with the Nature Civilization. It eats the mana of anyone.
 Marrow Ooze – A Zombie that is associated with the Darkness Civilization.
 Megaria, the Collector (voiced by Rachel Robinson) – A Dark Lord that is associated with the Darkness Civilization. She is the sister of Gregoria the Malevolent. Empress Megaria scours her vast territory to gather desirable things that slip through the cracks of both worlds, such as lost treasures and forgotten secrets. Her collection is enormous and contains many dangerous things. She has a history with Master Jaha who once fought Megaria's brother. In the episode "Darkness on the Edge of Town," Megaria poses as Piper in her latest attempt to get Allison on her side after reclaiming her mask from Gregoria. Megaria has one of her loyal creatures steal a truck containing The Choten's evolution serum. In "Into the Void," Megaria takes advantage of Allie falling under the control of the Cloak of Dark Illusion. With help from Ray, Allie was able to get the Cloak of Dark Illusion off and was able to fend off Megaria. At the end of "Forest for the Trees," The Choten has formed an alliance with Megaria. She is this franchise version of Megaria, Empress of Dread.
 Memory Swarm – A Cyber Virus that is associated with the Water Civilization. The Memory Swarm has the ability to erase a person's memory to a certain point in time. A person's back-up memories reside in a Mother Virus within the Water Civilization. According to Master Nadia Lobachevsky before she uses them on Ray, Allie and Gabe, the memory-erasing process these creatures use on other living things can be quite painful. In the show, they are simply referred to as Cyber Viruses.
 Meteor Dragon – An Armored Dragon that is associated with the Fire Civilization. A Meteor Dragon is the partner of Master Tiera until it betrays her, seemingly killing her. It turned out that Master Tiera couldn't control its evolved form. He is this franchise's version of Astrocomet Dragon.
 Midnight Crawler – An Earth Eater that is associated with the Water Civilization. A Midnight Crawler attacks the Quillspike Tribe's land. It takes the tribes of the Nature Civilization to help defeat Midnight Crawler and drive it back into the Water Civilization. In "Mixed Vegetables," Midnight Crawler returns to destroy the Quillspike's territory. It is revealed that the Water Civilization has upgraded him and he now has two cannons on his arms which shoot ice beams and turn everything into ice. Midnight Crawler is repelled by Tatsurion the Unchained, the Quillspike Tribe, and the Wild Veggies.
 Moorna the Vengeful (voiced by Grey DeLisle) – An Armored Dragon that is associated with the Fire Civilization and the daughter of Napalmeon the Conquering. She is Tatsurion the Unchained's half-sister and she has tried to kill him on several occasions. In "Bring Me the Head of Tatsurion the Unchained," Alakshmi summons Moorna at Lord Skycrusher's suggestion to work with Alakshmi. It is Moorna's idea to capture Tatsurion the Unchained's mother Headstrong Wanderer and use her to draw him to Kiln Canyon so that she can have her former fiancé Brutalus get revenge on him for the incident that placed a bounty on Tatsurion the Unchained. This plan didn't work as Brutalus isn't interested in taking revenge on Tatsurion.
 Mother Virus – A Cyber Virus that is associated with the Water Civilization. All creatures in the Cyber Virus category are connected to the Mother Virus.
 Motorcycle Man (voiced by Scott Wolf) – A Tarborg that is associated with the Darkness Civilization. In "Dueling Partners," a Motorcycle Man was seen in Queen Kalima's palace. In "Brainjacked," a group of Motorcycle Men accompanied Gregoria in her invasion upon San Campion. He is this franchise's version of Motorcycle Mutant.
 Mystics (voiced by John DiMaggio) – There are different types of Mystics in this show.
 Fire Mystic – The Fire Mystic is a Mystic that is associated with the Fire Civilization. It trapped Master Tiera in a mana-dampening armor when she tried to control it after it repaired her gauntlet. It later taught Raiden the Spell of Absolute Incineration.
 Darkness Mystic – The Darkness Mystic is a Mystic that is associated with the Darkness Civilization. It gave Raiden a choice to either submit or resist when he was sucked into the Cloak of Dark Illusion which ended with Raiden resisting, escaping the Cloak of Dark Illusion, and learning the Spell of Absolute Darkness.
 Nature Mystic – The Nature Mystic is a Mystic that is associated with the Nature Civilization. In "Forest for the Trees," Raiden's vision-dreams have led him to the Nature Mysticwho teaches Raiden the Spell of Swift Regeneration which is used to restore the horns of the Rumbling Terrasaurs and the tusks of Mighty Shouter.
 Water Mystic – The Water Mystic is a Mystic that is associated with the Water Civilization. In "Bargain," Raiden Pierce-Okamoto and Tatsurion the Unchained find the Water Mystic in the frozen parts of the Water Civilization. The Water Mystic questions Ray's actions when it comes to helping his father. The Water Mystic then gives Ray the Spell of Liquid Compulsion and will detail the info on how to use the spell and when to use it.
 Light Mystic – The Light Mystic is a Mystic that is associated with the Light Civilization. In "The Evolution Will Not Be Televised," Sasha takes Raiden to the Light Mystic who states that he can't give Raiden the Spell of Radiant Purification yet and that it must be used at the right time. The Light Mystic arrived with Raiden on the Choten's ship where the Choten predicted this and has captured it so that the Mystics can serve as his Ultimate Batteries in his goal to take over both worlds. Raiden managed to free the Light Mystic. After the Choten escapes, the Light Mystic calls the other Mystics so that Raiden can perform the Spell of Radiant Purification to undo the Choten's evolutionary damages to the Creatures.
 Napalmeon the Conquering – An Armored Dragon that is associated with the Fire Civilization. He is the forbidden love of Headstrong Wanderer and the father of both Tatsurion the Unchained, Moorna the Vengeful, and some unnamed Armored Dragons. Napalmeon was not the best father for Tatsurion the Unchained when Tatsurion the Unchained sought him out to know him better. Tatsurion the Unchained was born a hybrid and Napalmeon the Conquering didn't lift a claw when Tatsurion the Unchained's Armored Dragon siblings pick on him. However, Napalmeon the Conquering ensures that Tatsurion the Unchained has an extensive education in strategy and combat arts. It was mentioned that Napalmeon the Conquering is dead.
 Necrodragon Abzo Dolba – A Terror Dragon that is associated with the Darkness Civilization.
 Necrodragon of Vile Ichor – A Terror Dragon that is associated with the Darkness Civilization. Fingers uses the Cloak of Dark Illusion to summon a Necrodragon of Vile Ichor to attack Sasha's citadel.
 Nimbus Scout – An Enforcer that is associated with the Light Civilization. The Nimbus Scouts are designed for long-endurance missions at the farthest parts of the Light Civilization. They are equipped with heavy-duty power systems that allow them to patrol for years at a time between recharges. It is this franchise's version of Frei, Vizier of Air.
 Ninja Pumpkin (voiced by Phil LaMarr) – A Wild Veggie that is associated with the Nature Civilization. It resembles a creature with a pumpkin head and a plant-like body.
 Obsidian Death – A Tarborg/Colossus that is associated with the Darkness and Nature Civilizations. In the episode "The Rising" Part 1, a flashback shows that The Choten uses Obsidian Death to help him look for Ken Okamoto and Janet Pierce-Okamoto in the Nature Civilization.
 Orion, Radiant Fury – A three-headed Celestial Dragon that is associated with the Light Civilization. Before the creation of the Veil, Orion is the protector of humanity and has a constellation named after him.
 Panopter – A Battle Sphere that is associated with the Light and Water Civilizations. It is given to Gabe by Sasha to monitor San Campion since Nigel takes Argus, Vigilant Seer. Originally a pure Light Creature, Gabe has trouble working with it (partly because due to Nigel's sabotage of the Stalker Spheres), so Glu-urrgle 2.0 augments it with Water Civilization technology.
 Phosphorescent Ghost – A Specter that is associated with the Darkness Civilization.
 Piercing Seer (voiced by Phil LaMarr) – A Spirit Totem that is associated with the Nature Civilization He leads the Nature Civilization's Dueling Games. Chief Many-Tribes decides who is allowed to participate, and his fierce adherence to regulation is matched only by the pleasure he takes in denying entry to outsiders. in the TV series. He is known as Chief Many-Tribes in the card game and is this franchise's version of Bliss Totem, Avatar of Luck.
 Pierr, Psycho Doll – An Evil Toy that is associated with the Darkness Civilization. It is among the Darkness Civilization creatures loyal to Megaria.
 Quillspike Tribe – The Quillspikes are a Beast Kin tribe that are associated with the Nature Civilization. The Quillspike Tribe work as farmers. Each of its members resemble humanoid porcupines. Their territory is lessened when Midnight Crawler eats their land, until the other Nature Civilization creatures help to defeat it. Upon Almighty Colossus' return to the Nature Civilization, the Quillspike Tribe regains much of its land.
 Headstrong Wanderer (voiced by Kari Wahlgren) – A Beast Kin that is the matriarch of the Quillspike Tribe. She is the lover of Napalmion the Conquering, and the mother of Tatsurion, Razorhide, and Prickleback.
 Prickleback (voiced by Phil LaMarr) – A Beast Kin that is a member of the Quillspike Tribe. He is the son of Headstrong Wanderer, the brother of Razorhide, and the half-brother of Tatsurion. He and Tatsurion are friendly rivals.
 Razorhide (voiced by Dee Bradley Baker) – A Beast Kin that is a member of the Quillspike Tribe. He is the son of Headstrong Wanderer, Prickleback's brother, and the half-brother of Tatsurion.  
 Quillspike Rumblers – The tribesmen of the Quillspike Tribe.
 Raging Goliant (voiced by Dee Bradley Baker) – A Beast Kin that is associated with the Nature Civilization, Raging Goliant teaches the offensive strategy to the other Beast Kin.
 Rain-Cloud Kraken – An Enforcer that is associated with the Light Civilization. It is this franchise's version of Calgo, Vizier of Rainclouds.
 Rapids Lurker, Wwhhshrll – A Trench Hunter that is associated with the Water Civilization. It resembles an eel-like creature and is a favorite of The Choten and Alakshmi.
 Rapscallion (voiced by James Arnold Taylor) – A Wild Veggie that is associated with the Nature Civilization, it resembles a humanoid scallion. He is this franchise's version of No Dandy Leekio (who is based on a leek).
 Ravenous Web-Leg – A Shadow Champion that is associated with the Darkness Civilization. They serve as the guards to Queen Kalima's lair.
 Razorpine Tree – A Star Sentinel that is associated with the Light Civilization.
 Redscale Drakon (voiced by Scott Wolf) – A Drakon associated with the Fire Civilization. This Drakon is more on the offensive than the defensive. He is this franchise's version of Onslaughter Triceps (and is listed as such in the credits).
 Roaming Bloodmane (voiced by Freddy Rodriguez) – A Beast Kin that is associated with the Nature Civilization. It resembles a burly cat-like creature with four long fangs. He has been living on the human side of the Veil separated from the Creature World where his sightings by hunters mistook him for Bigfoot. If threatened, he can call forth Mana Ticks from his mane to distract his enemy while he makes his next move.
 Rodi Gale, Night Guardian – An evolved Enforcer that is associated with the Light Civilization. In the episode "Boosted," Master Nigel summons and evolves it from an Enforcer to fight against Ray and Allie.
 Rothos the Destroyer – A Stomper that is associated with the Fire Civilization. It is a gladiator that fights in the Blast Forge arena. It battled against Allie, who was trapped inside Sledge Bot. It is this franchise's version of Rothus, the Traveler.
 Rumbling Terrasaur – A Tusker that is associated with the Nature Civilization. It resembles a large armored rhinoceros. Before he learns the art of Kaijudo, Ray unknowingly summons a Rumbling Terrasaur when he is threatened by Carny and his gang. The horns of the Rumbling Terrasaurs can penetrate the Veil. In the episode "Boosted," Ray summons Rumbling Terrasaur to fight Nigel's Fluorogill Manta and temporarily evolves it into Noble Rumbling Terrasaur, which is larger and spikier than Rumbling Terrasaur. In the episode "Extracurricular Activities," The Choten obtains the horn of a Rumbling Terrasaur which Fingers and Heller use to rob the banks of San Campion. In "Forest for the Trees," Heller and Carny start harvesting the horns of the Rumbling Terrasaurs. It is revealed that most of the Rumbling Terrasaur's mana is in its horn. After Heller and Carny get away, Ray used the Spell of Swift Regeneration to restore the horns of the Rumbling Terrasaurs.
 Saucer Head Shark – A Trench Hunter that is associated with the Water Civilization. The Saucer Head Sharks are coated in a slippery, gelatinous material, causing many creatures' attacks to slide right off. The Saucer Head Shark can use the spheres that surround it as projectiles.
 Scavenger Chimera – A Chimera that is associated with the Darkness Civilization. In "Brainjacked," two Scavenging Chimeras accompanied Gregoria in her invasion upon San Campion.
 Sentrus – An Enforcer that is associated with the Light Civilization. Master Nigel rode one in the episode "Heavenly Creatures."
 Shaman Broccoli (voiced by Dee Bradley Baker) – A Wild Veggie that is associated with the Nature Civilization. It resembles a one-eyed humanoid broccoli.
 Shaw K'Naw – A Thunder Guardian that is associated with the Light Civilization. When Heller obtains a Gauntlet from a truck that belongs to The Choten, he uses Shaw K'Naw to commit robberies. When Ray and Fumes break Heller's gauntlet, Shaw K'Naw turns on Heller until Ray tells it that revenge isn't part of the Light Civilization and returns him to the Kaiju Realm.
 Silver Fist – A Beast Kin that is associated with the Nature Civilization. He resembles a humanoid Indian rhinoceros that wears an eyepatch. Silver Fist serves as an ambassador to the Fire Civilization.
 Simian Trooper Grash – A Stomper that is associated with the Fire Civilization. Simian Trooper Grash is frequently used by Carny. He is referred to as Simian Warrior Grash in the TV series.
 Skeeter Swarmer – A Brain Jacker that is associated with the Darkness Civilization. Gabe tries unsuccessfully to use the banishment spell on it in training. In "Brainjacked," Kevin unknowingly uses Carny's gauntlet to summon a swarm of Skeeter Swarmers which take over the minds of everyone at San Campion Middle School. It is this franchise's version of Bloody Squito.
 Skeleton Soldier – A Zombie that is associated with the Darkness Civilization. A group of Skeleton Soldiers make up Megaria the Collector's army, and she uses them to patrol the remote caverns and deep tunnels. It is this franchise's version of Skeleton Soldier, the Defiled.
 Skulking Cypress – A Zombie/Tree Kin that is associated with the Darkness and Nature Civilizations. In "Mixed Vegetables," a Skulking Cypress attacks Master Kimora and the kids.
 Skull Cutter – A Dread Mask that is associated with the Darkness Civilization.
 Skycrusher's Elite – A Drakon that is associated with the Fire Civilization. Skycrusher's Elites serve as the law enforcement of Blastforge City.
 Skycrusher's Volcano-Ship – An Inferno Complex that is associated with the Fire Civilization. Lord Skycrusher holds many creatures captive as slaves aboard his fortress until it crashes during the conflict with Finbarr's Dreadnought.
 Sledge Bot – A Stomper that is associated with the Fire Civilization. Allie was forced to pilot it as a vehicle in the Blast Forge arena against Rothos the Destroyer until it was damaged in the fight. It is this franchise's version of Smash Warrior Stagrandu.
 Slyth (voiced by Phil LaMarr) – A Specter that is associated with the Darkness Civilization. Slyth often serves as Master Jaha's informant-for-hire.
 Snapclaw – A Megabug that is associated with the Nature Civilization. Snapclaws are unpredictable creatures whose powers depend on how many Megabugs are nearby. It is this franchise's version of Scissor Scarab.
 Snaptongue Lizard – A Dune Gecko that is associated with the Fire Civilization. They are so strong that they wear specially-forged armors.
 Sniper Mosquito – A Megabug that is associated with the Nature Civilization. It resembles a giant mosquito. The Sniper Mosquitoes are deadly nuisances. A Sniper Mosquito appears in Japan where it causes havoc. With the unlikely help from Grandpa Raiden Okamoto, Ray, Isao, and the other Duel Masters are able to send it back across the Veil.
 Spinning Terror (voiced by Jason Marsden) – A Dread Mask that is associated with the Darkness Civilization. It is one of Megaria, the Collector's minions and runs her castle's day-to-day operations.
 Splinterclaw Wasp – A Megabug that is associated with the Nature Civilization. They live in Deepwood, a place in the center of the Nature Civilization where the largest creatures in Civilization roam.
 Spore Siren – A Tree Kin that is associated with the Nature Civilization.
 Spyweb Scurrier – A Battle Sphere that is associated with the Light Civilization.
 Squillace Scourge – A Leviathan/Chimera that is associated with the Water Civilization and the Darkness Civilization. It resembles a shark-headed creature with tentacles.
 Stalker Sphere – An Enforcer associated with the Light Civilization. Master Nigel Brightmore uses the Stalker Spheres to record and spy on The Choten's activities.
 Star Lantern – A Star Sentinel that is associated with the Light Civilization. It is this franchise's version of Pulsar Tree.
 Starlight Strategist – A Skyforce Champion that is associated with the Light Civilization. It is this franchise's version of Ethel, Star Sea Elemental (which is an Angel Command).
 Steam Star Grapplog – A Cyber Virus that is associated with the Water Civilization. It resembles a starfish with tentacles at the tip of its star points.
 Steel Hammer (voiced by James Arnold Taylor) – A Beast Kin that is associated with the Nature Civilization. It resembles a humanoid wild boar and wields a large stone weapon. He is this franchise's version of Steel Smasher.
 Stonesaur – A Rock Brute that is associated with the Fire Civilization. It is this franchise's version of Stonesaur.
 Striding Hearthwood – A Tree Kin that is associated with the Nature Civilization. It looks like a humanoid tree with a birdhouse on a chain around its neck. It is this franchise's version of Mimosa, the Strong.
 Sun-Stalk Seed – A Star Sentinel that is associated with the Light Civilization.
 Super Bazooka Volcanodon (voiced by Dee Bradley Baker) – A Drakon that is associated with the Fire Civilization. They are the heavy weapons specialists for the Fire Civilization. It is this franchise's version of Super Explosive Volcanodon.
 Swampstench Worm – A Rot Worm that is associated with the Darkness Civilization. In "Fallout," Gregoria rode a Swampstench Worm during her invasion on San Campion.
 Sword Horned – An Enforcer/Beast Kin that is associated with the Light Civilization and the Nature Civilization. It resembles a large armored deer with four sword-shaped antlers. Alex summons Sword Horned to break up the battle between Ra-Vu the Stormbringer and Tatsurion the Unchained.
 Terradragon Regarion Doom – An Earthstrike Dragon that is associated with the Nature Civilization.
 The Great Arena – A Living City that is associated with the Nature Civilization. On its back is the Nature Civilization's dueling arena. The Great Arena is used to host the Nature Dueling Games, where hundreds of Nature Civilization creatures come out to challenge each other for supremacy. In "Fallout," the Great Arena was used as a refuge for the Nature Civilization creatures that lost their homes when the Nature Civilization was flooded. It is this franchise's version of Brigade Shell Q (which was also a Survivor Monster in the original franchise).
 Thorny Creeper – A Tree Kin that is associated with the Nature Civilization.
 Three-Eyed Dragonfly – A Megabug that is associated with the Nature Civilization.
 Transforming Totem (voiced by Dee Bradley Baker) – A Spirit Totem that is associated with the Nature Civilization. Transforming Totem is charged with the duty of running the Nature Civilization Games at The Great Arena.
 Tygrif – A Chimera that is associated with the Darkness Civilization. It has the front half of its body like a tiger, rear legs and wings like a bird, multiple eyes, and a cannon on its back. It is this franchise's version of Gigagriff.
 Urth, the Overlord – A Skyforce Champion that is associated with the Light Civilization. It is this franchise's version of Urth, Purifying Elemental (which is an Angel Command).
 Venom Worm – A Rot Worm that is associated with the Darkness Civilization.
 Vicious Coffer – A Mimic that is associated with the Darkness Civilization. It resembles a treasure chest. It is said that when a creature gets too close, it will be swallowed and tortured until the end of time. It is this franchise's version of Jagila, the Hidden Pillager.
 Vikorakas – A Trench Hunter that is associated with the Water Civilization. It has 24 tentacles that can paralyze anything it touches.
 Vorg (voiced by John DiMaggio) – A Berserker that is associated with the Fire Civilization. He serves as Lord Skycrusher's chef. Some of Lord Skycrusher's servants say that Vorg is immortal, while other servants of Lord Skycrusher say that Vorg is a baron in the services of Lord Skycrusher. He is this franchise's version of Immortal Baron, Vorg.
 Wandering Brain-Eater – A Zombie that is associated with the Darkness Civilization. In "The Taken," Fingers claimed to have summoned a Wandering Brain-Eater once. In "Brainjacked," a Wandering Brain-Eater accompanied Gregoria in her invasion upon San Campion.
 Writhing Bone Ghoul – A Zombie that is associated with the Darkness Civilization. The Choten uses his evolution serum on a Writhing Bone Ghoul, evolving it into Impalicus.
 Xeno Mantis – A Megabug that is associated with the Nature Civilization. Xeno Mantises are known to eat Tuskers. They crawl with hundreds of tiny Megabug larvae that threaten to attack anybody who threatens their host.

Civilizations
The Realm of the Creatures is divided into five civilizations. In each civilization, the creatures are either unique in certain abilities or share some abilities with those in other civilizations. Some creatures belong to two or more civilizations. While some of the races have retained their names from the original Duel Masters franchise, some races have been renamed in this franchise.

Darkness Civilization
The creatures of the Darkness Civilization make their homes in a deep caves as they are the "bump in the night." The artifact of the Darkness Civilization is the Cloak of Dark Illusion which can turn the wearer invisible, give the wearer the form of anyone or anything, and has a mind of its own.

The races of the Darkness Civilization consist of:

 Brain Jackers – The Brain Jackers are spider-like creatures from the Darkness Civilization. They have no measurable intelligence, possess flabby body cavities and operate by manipulating the dead (like the Rot Worms). They cling to the head of a dead creature, stick their legs into the brain and manipulate the nervous system, allowing them to control its movements.
 Chimeras – The Chimeras are by-products of the Dark Lords' bionic experiments, deformed creatures, often amalgams of various beings with wildlife as the prototype. They protect themselves with fangs, poison or even protruding bones, and any special abilities they may have varies from creature to creature based on its ancestry.
 Dark Lords – Dark Lords are the highest-ranking creatures in the Darkness Civilization. Unlike the Angel Commands of the Light Civilization, who cooperate with each other, Dark Lords often fight amongst themselves for control of territory in the Darkness Civilization. The Dark Lords are responsible for creating the Chimeras, Shadow Champions and Terror Dragons. Queen Kalima is the highest-ranking Dark Lord and ruler of the Darkness Civilization.
 Dread Masks – The Dread Masks are a race of species made from the skulls of creatures that sought life after death. Dread Masks come in different shapes and sizes. They are this franchise's version of the Devil Masks.
 Evil Toys – The Evil Toys are artificial creatures manipulated by the Dark Lords as disposable weapons. Although they have strings like marionettes, they have no operator. They are this franchise's version of the Death Puppets.
 Mimics – The Mimics resemble treasure chests, awaiting unsuspecting souls to come along so they can devour them and their souls. They are this franchise's version of Pandora's box.
 Rot Worms – The Rot Worms are gigantic Worms with large mouths. They have no native intelligence, but exist with the help of the dead. They are this franchise's version of Parasite Worms.
 Shadow Champions – The Shadow Champions are the most powerful warriors in the Darkness Civilization. Scarce in number, the Shadow Champions are a race created by Dark Lords using their most advanced secret technology. They are this franchise's version of the Demon Commands.
 Specters – The Specters are spirits that reside in the Darkness Civilization. They belong to the Dark Lords, and they need the powers of the Dark Lords to sustain their lives. They are this franchise's version of the Ghosts.
 Tarborgs – The Tarborgs are souls born from the sludge and ooze found in the Darkness Civilization. They are cunning and cold-hearted. They are this franchise's version of the Hedrians.
 Terror Dragons – The Terror Dragons have slept beneath the swamps of the Darkness Civilization. They are created from the reanimated remains and body parts of other civilizations' dragons by Dark Lords using massive amounts of Darkness mana. They are this franchise's version of the Zombie Dragons.
 Zombies – The Zombies are the more populous of all the creatures in the Darkness Civilization. Long ago, their ancestors sought unsuccessfully to attain immortality by infecting themselves with special strains of viruses. They are this franchise's version of the Living Dead.

Fire Civilization
The creatures of the Fire Civilization make their home in the area which consists of shimmering deserts and rocky badlands all surrounded by active volcanoes.  The Fire Civilization utilizes volcano-like warships that can drop magma bombs.  The artifact of the Fire Civilization is the Sword of Fiery Cataclysm, which enables its user to gain control over any creature of the Fire Civilization and summon them at any time.

The races of the Fire Civilization consist of:

 Armored Dragons – The Armored Dragons are the most powerful creatures in the Fire Civilization. They are very vain and proud of their pure blood. Possessing superior knowledge of warfare and sporting powerful weaponry, they are often considered "gods of war". The Armored Dragons are worshiped by the Drakons.
 Attack Raptors – The Attack Raptors are dragons that have been bred for fighting by the Drakons. They are this franchise's version of the Armored Wyverns.
 Berserkers – The Berserkers are a proud race of humans that live in the Fire Civilization. They are this franchise's version of the Humans.
 Blaze Champions – The Blaze Champions are a warrior race from the Fire Civilization. They are this franchise's version of the Flame Command.
 Burn Bellies – The Burn Bellies are small creatures with a large appetite for anything flammable and the ability to belch fire. They are this franchise's version of the Machine Eaters.
 Drakons – The Drakons are humanoid reptiles that worship Armored Dragons. They are this franchise's version of the Dragonoids and one Melt Warrior.
 Dune Geckos – The Dune Geckos are lizard-like creatures that inhabit the deserts and hills of the Fire Civilization. The Dune Geckos trained by the Drakons are equipped with armor.
 Fire Birds – The Fire Birds are small bird-like creatures that flame up. Unlike other Fire creatures, they are not generally aggressive.
 Inferno Complex – The Inferno Complexes are a race of flying Volcano Warships.
 Melt Warriors – The Melt Warriors are a group of fiery lizard creatures that are closely related to the Drakons.
 Rock Brutes – The Rock Brutes are a race of living rock monsters that survive by consuming magma. They are this franchise's version of the Rock Beasts.
 Stompers – The Stompers are a race of advanced robots.  They are this franchise's version of the Armorloids.

Light Civilization
The creatures of the Light Civilization make their home in the majestic floating cities in the sky. The artifact of the Light Civilization is the Heart of Light, which enables anyone who possesses it to detect the presence of any Light Civilization creature no matter where they are.

The races of the Light Civilization consist of:

 Angel Commands – Angel Commands are the most powerful and highest-ranked Light creatures. All other Light creatures will follow the orders of the Angel Commands. Sasha, Channeler of Light is an Angel Command as is the queen monarch Eternal Haven, Angelic Liege. Angel Commands cannot be controlled by a Duel Master (as shown in the episode "The Unbearable Being of Lightness" when Master Nigel is unable to stop Sasha from leaving the Duel Masters temple). So far, the Angel Command creatures featured are this franchise's version of the Mecha del Sol.
 Battle Spheres – They are this franchise's version of the Light Bringers.
 Celestial Dragons – The Celestial Dragons are a race of dragons made from Light Civilization technology and the essence of the constellations for the purpose of bringing order and justice to the Creature World. They are natural enemies of the Armored Dragons and Terror Dragons.  Each one has a title of a constellation in its name. They are this franchise's version of the Apollonia Dragons.
 Enforcers – The Enforcers are artificial life-forms that serve Angel Command.  They hover in place when not in use and can bend light around themselves to appear practically invisible.  They are this franchise's version of the Initiates.
 Fractals – The Fractals are a race from the Light Civilization. As the Civilization places tremendous importance on order and logic, Fractals feature highly ornate, deliberately symmetrical and geometric bodies, which are reflections of the Civilization's philosophy. They are this franchise's version of the Berserkers.
 Invaders – The Invaders are UFO-like creatures that are used for transport.  They are this franchise's version of the Gladiators.
 Mecha Thunder – The Mecha Thunders are metallic warriors that can manipulate wind, thunder and lightning.  They are this franchise's version of the Mecha Thunders.
 Skyforce Champions – The Skyforce Champions are part humanoid, part metal. They hide in the clouds, where they surround themselves with thunder and lightning, and they create what appears to be natural disasters with their weather-controlling ability. They are this franchise's version of the Mecha Thunders and some Angel Command monsters.
 Sky Weavers – Sky Weavers are a race of spider-like creature that can spin webs made out of light. They are this franchise's version of the Soltroopers.
 Star Sentinels – The Star Sentinels are among the few wildlife in the Light Civilization. Varying in shape and size, they are gregarious plants that float in the air and emit a faint light. They are this franchise's version of the Starlight Trees.
 Storm Patrols – The Storm Patrols serve as the defenders of the Light Civilization. Shaped like birds and futuristic spacecraft and aircraft to increase mobility, the Storm Patrols can vary in size from automobiles to tanks. Upon detection of any invaders, the Storm Patrols will swoop in, swarm over the invaders, and eradicate them. They are this franchise's versions of the Guardians.

Nature Civilization
The Nature Civilization is the largest kingdom of the Creature Realms and it threatens to grow larger every day, which conflicts with the other four Civilizations. It is always "survival of the fittest" in this civilization. The artifact of the Nature Civilization is the Shield of Unity, which compels all tribes to come to the aid of whatever tribe uses it.

The races of the Nature Civilization consist of:

 Beast Kin – The Beast Kin are the most popular race in the Nature Civilization.  As the most powerful warriors of the Nature Civilization, the Beast Kin are equal in strength to the Armored Dragons. They are this franchise's version of the Beast Folk.
 Colossus – The Colossi are a race of large creatures with three eyes, enormous muscles, spikes on their shoulders, tough skin, and a human-like posture. They are this franchise's version of the Giants.
 Earthstrike Dragons – The Earthstrike Dragons are a race of dragons that live beneath the roots of the trees. They are this franchise's version of the Earth Dragons.
 Flying Fungi – The Flying Fungi are a race of fungus creatures that grow on the dark forest floor. They absorb nutrients and strength from other living plants. When they grow, their skin sacs fill with a poisonous gas, which enables them to hover above the ground. They are this franchise's version of the Balloon Mushrooms.
 Living Cities – The Living Cities are cities that live on the backs of humongous beetles. They are this franchise's version of the Colony Beetles.
 Megabugs – The Megabugs are meat-eating predators trying to claim the top spot on the Nature Civilization's food chain. Varying in size from three to 10 feet, they include dragonflies, grasshoppers, praying mantis, beetles, and butterflies. They are this franchise's version of the Giant Insects.
 Primal Champions – They are this franchise's version of the Gaia Command.
 Snow Sprite – The Snow Sprites are found in the snowy regions of the Nature Civilization. They are this franchise's version of the Snow Faeries.
 Spirit Totems – The Spirit Totems are trees that have been possessed by the spirits of gigantic plants. They are this franchise's version of the Mystery Totems.
 Tree Kin – The Tree Kin are a powerful, highly intelligent race of plant creatures able to control the minds of others. They are this franchise's version of the Tree Folk.
 Tuskers – The Tuskers are herbivorous animals that are found throughout the Nature Civilization. Surprisingly agile, they are mild-tempered herd animals with large horns. When they become spooked, the Tuskers erupt into a deadly stampede. They are this franchise's version of the Horned Beasts.
 Wild Veggies – The Wild Veggies are a race of sentient, humanoid garden vegetables that live deep in the forests of the Nature Civilization. Though generally not powerful individually, together they can accomplish great tasks and offer aid to other Nature races.

Water Civilization
The Water Civilization is located within a large body of water. The creatures of the Water Civilization are the most centered and peaceful. They don't start battles, but when provoked they will retaliate in full force. The artifact of the Water Civilization is the Helm of Ultimate Technology, which can be used by anyone who is mentally-skilled to telepathically control any creature in the Water Civilization.

The races of the Water Civilization consist of:

 Aquans – The Aquans are the most populous race in the Water Civilization. The first version of the Aquans are transparent humanoids recognizable by the web of glittering cables running through them. Their bodies are encased in fluid that can be transformed as necessary. By changing from liquid to solid or vapor, they have the ability to use their bodies for transportation on land or water, weaponry, or defense. The second version of the Aquans are part-humanoid part-fish. They are this franchise's version of the Liquid People and the Merfolk.
 Cyber Lords – The Cyber Lords are the ruling race of the Water Civilization. They communicate through telepathy and often look like infants floating in fluid-filled tubes. They are highly intelligent and technologically advanced. Each has a special chip in its head, connected to other parts of its body by glittering cables. Though they are mentally superior, Cyber Lords tend to be physically lacking.
 Cyber Complex – The Cyber Complexes are a race of creatures in the Water Civilization. They are living fortresses created by the Cyber Lords. They are this franchise's version of the Cyber Moons.
 Cyber Virus – The Cyber Virus are artificially constructed, luminous creatures made by the Cyber Lords. Ranging from the size of plankton to as large as a room, they have the ability to disrupt the electrical processes of machines and living minds. They can infiltrate computers, reprogram databases, or even rewrite memories.
 Earth Eaters – The Earth Eaters are highly destructive, mechanical engines created by the Water Civilization Ancients for land acquisition. Some have viscous skin, while others are scaly. Unlike other Water races, they are equipped with internal fusion furnaces. They devour land in order to expand the Water Civilization's borders, and anything they devour is decomposed by powerful enzymes and liquified within their furnaces.
 Leviathans – The Leviathans are the largest, most powerful race of the Water Civilization. With little gravity to affect their growth, they have become enormous and are often mistaken for landmasses. They resemble giant fish and other deep-sea creatures, and some Leviathans have the word King or Queen in their names, depending on the gender.
 Riptide Champions – The Riptide Champions are a race of warriors from the Water Civilization. They are this franchise's version of the Cyber Command.
 Trench Hunters – The Trench Hunters are a transparent race of fish created by the Cyber Lords. They have a shiny line of cable running the length of their bodies and a chip in each hunter's head for sending and receiving brain waves. If the chip is damaged, the Trench Hunter will go berserk. They are used for transportation, defense and weaponry. They are this franchise's version of the Fish, Gel Fish, and Sea Hackers.
 Tsunami Dragons – The Tsunami Dragons are a race of dragon from the Water Civilization.  They are this franchise's version of the Poseidia Dragons and Blue Command Dragons.
 Undertow Engines – The Undertow Engines are robot-like shellfish that resemble crabs, shrimp, starfish, and hermit crabs, who are controlled by the Aquans and Cyber Lords.  They are used as mobile forts and shock troops, and they attack by emitting bright sparks or supersonic or electromagnetic waves to disrupt enemy attacks. They are this franchise's version of the Cyber Clusters.

Shared Races
The five civilizations each share a specific race with some of them being shared by all five civilizations:

 Corrupted – In the card game, the Corrupted are a group of creatures that are under The Choten's control. They are from the five Civilizations and sport the "Choten's Mark" on parts of their bodies. The cards of the Corrupted have the same color of the cards from the Water Civilization. They are similar to the Survivors where they rely on sharing effects/abilities between creatures (though there are significant differences both mechanically and flavor-wise).
 Mystic – The Mystics are associated with all five Creature Civilizations.
 Spirit Quartz – The Spirit Quartz are living crystal entities, each composed of gems originating from two civilizations. They tend to follow their own ways, not being bonded to any individual realm of origin. For example, Cindermoss Quartz is shared by the Fire Civilization and the Nature Civilization.

Kaijudo